is a near-Earth asteroid and Earth trojan discovered by the Pan-STARRS 1 survey at Haleakala Observatory, Hawaii on 12 December 2020. It oscillates around the Sun–Earth  Lagrangian point (leading 60°), one of the dynamically stable locations where the combined gravitational force acts through the Sun's and Earth's barycenter. Analysis of 's trojan orbit stability suggests it will remain around Earth's  point for at least four thousand years until gravitational perturbations from repeated close encounters with Venus destabilize its trojan configuration.

Discovery 
 was discovered by the Pan-STARRS 1 survey at Haleakala Observatory, Hawaii on 12 December 2020. It was first observed in the constellation Crater at an apparent magnitude of 21.4.

The asteroid was subsequently listed on the Minor Planet Center's Near-Earth Object Confirmation Page (NEOCP) as P11aRcq. Over two days, follow-up observations were carried out by the Višnjan Observatory , ESA Optical Ground Station , and Cerro Tololo Observatory . The asteroid was identified in earlier Mount Lemmon Survey  observations from 26 November 2020.

Name and numbering 
This minor planet was given the permanent number 614689 by the Minor Planet Center on 28 March 2022 and is now eligible for naming. In accordance with the International Astronomical Union's naming conventions for near-Earth objects,  will be given a mythological name.

Orbit and classification 

The asteroid has been identified in several precovery observations by various sky surveys, including Pan-STARRS, from dates as far back as December 2012.

 orbits the Sun at an average distance of 1.001 AU once every  days, or approximately 1 Earth year. Its orbit has a high eccentricity of 0.388 and an inclination of 13.8° with respect to the ecliptic plane. Over the course of its orbit, its distance from the Sun ranges from 0.61 AU at perihelion to 1.39 AU at aphelion, crossing the orbits of Venus and Earth. Since its orbit crosses that of Earth's while having a semi-major axis greater than 1 AU (by a small margin),  is classified as an Apollo asteroid.

Trojan orbit 

In reality, they oscillate around such a point.

On 26 January 2021, amateur astronomer Tony Dunn reported that 's nominal trajectory appears to be librating about Earth's leading  Lagrangian point, suspecting it to be an Earth trojan. Subsequent analysis confirmed modeling stability for at least several thousand years into the future based on existing orbital parameters. This would make  more stable than the prototype  Earth trojan , which is potentially unstable on timescales of less than 2,000 years. Additional follow-up observations and precoveries confirmed 's trojan nature, and showed that it will leave trojan orbit at least 4,000 years into the future. Numerical simulations indicate that  was likely captured into the  Langrangian point since the 15th century.

's high orbital eccentricity results in wide, tadpole-shaped oscillation paths in a corotating reference frame with Earth and its Lagrangian points. Venus's influence on 's orbit will become greater over time as their longitudes of the ascending node precess over hundreds of years, lowering 's Venus MOID and eventually destabilizing its trojan orbit by sending it to Earth's  point in several thousand years.

Physical characteristics 
Photometric measurements of optical observations from 2020–2021 show that  exhibits a color resembling that of carbonaceous C-type asteroids. This makes  the largest Earth trojan asteroid known to date, being up to three times as large as the -sized .

Because  is only visible at low altitudes in the sky during twilight, atmospheric distortions and scattered light from the Sun hinder accurate photometry of the asteroid's light curve, thus information about its rotation could not be determined.

Exploration 
Due to 's high orbital inclination, a rendezvous mission to the asteroid from low Earth orbit (LEO) would require a minimum total delta-v of —too high to be considered an ideal target for a low-energy trajectory.

See also 
 Co-orbital configuration
 Claimed moons of Earth
 Horseshoe orbit
 Quasi-satellite

References

External links 
 Data from NSF's NOIRLab Show Earth Trojan Asteroid Is the Largest Found, NOIRLab, 1 February 2022
 Second Earth Trojan Discovered, Jeff Hecht, Sky & Telescope, 4 February 2021
 
 
 

614689
614689
614689
614689
614689
20201212
20201212